Tommy ("Tom") Henrik Werner (born 31 March 1966 in Karlskrona, Blekinge) was a freestyle swimmer from Sweden. He won the silver medal in the men's 4 × 200 m freestyle relay at the 1992 Summer Olympics together Christer Wallin, Anders Holmertz and Lars Frölander. He was affiliated with the University of California in Berkeley, California.

Personal bests

Long course (50 m)

Short course (25 m)

Clubs
Karlskrona SS

References

External links
 
 
 

1966 births
Living people
Swimmers at the 1984 Summer Olympics
Swimmers at the 1988 Summer Olympics
Swimmers at the 1992 Summer Olympics
Olympic swimmers of Sweden
Olympic silver medalists for Sweden
People from Karlskrona
University of California, Berkeley alumni
Swedish male freestyle swimmers
World Aquatics Championships medalists in swimming
Medalists at the FINA World Swimming Championships (25 m)
European Aquatics Championships medalists in swimming
Karlskrona SS swimmers
Medalists at the 1992 Summer Olympics
Olympic silver medalists in swimming
Sportspeople from Blekinge County